The Swedish Museum of Performing Arts (Swedish: Scenkonstmuseet), from 2010 to 2014 known as the Music and Theater Museum, is a museum in Stockholm, Sweden. The museum is dedicated to dance, music and theatre.

Collection and activities 
The museum presents a storyline rather than following a chronological order. There is a collection of 60,000 objects, including stage designs, hand written song texts and premiere pieces. There are at least 6,000 musical instruments as well as puppets, marionettes and costumes. Since its reopening in 2017 the museum has a broad emphasis on interactive activities: for example there is a gestrument, an aggregation between gesture and instrumentvisitors can make music by moving their bodies."

History 
The museum was founded in 2010 as the Music and Theater Museum. It closed on 30 March 2014 then reopened on 11 February 2017 with the new name Swedish Museum of Performing Arts (in English, Swedish: Scenkonstmuseet).

The museum originated in a merger of the Music Museum, Theater Museum and Puppet Museum:

See also 
 List of music museums

References

External links

 Official website

Music museums
Museums in Stockholm
Museums established in 1899
1899 establishments in Sweden
Music organizations based in Sweden